Ashok Chavda, also known by his pen name Bedil, is a Gujarati poet, writer and critic from Gujarat, India. His anthology of poetry, Dalkhi Thi Saav Chhutan (2012), was awarded the Yuva Puraskar by the Sahitya Akademi in 2013. His collection of known writings include Pagla Talaavma (2003), Pagarav Talaavma (2012), Tu Kahu Ke Tame (2012), Pityo Ashko (2012), Shabdoday (2012), and Ghazalistan (2012), which is a translation of Urdu ghazals written by Indian and Pakistani poets. He is also a recipient of the Yuva Gaurav Award (2012) from the Gujarat Sahitya Akademi, and the Dasi Jivan Award (2013–14) from the Government of Gujarat. He has appeared in several TV and radio programs on All India Radio and Doordarshan.

Early life and education 

Ashok Chavda was born on August 23, 1978, in Bhavnagar, Gujarat to Pitambarbhai and Hansabahen.

In 1998, Chavda received a Bachelor of Commerce in accounting from C.U. Shah Commerce College of Ahmedabad. In 2001, he received a Bachelor of Arts in English literature from H.K. Arts College of Ahmedabad. In 2003, he received a Master of Development Communication (MDC) from Gujarat University. His research for the MDC was titled Gujarati Dalit Kavitano Udabhav Ane Vikas: 1975-85 (Growth and Development of Gujarati Dalit Poetry: 1975–85).

He stayed at Gujarat University to receive his Ph.D. in Journalism and Mass Media, under Chandrakant Mehta, for his research titled Gujarati Dalit Samayik Patrakaratva Ni Vikasyatra (Growth and Development of Gujarati Dalit Periodicals). He passed the National Eligibility Test (UGC NET) in Mass Communication and Journalism in 2012. He then completed his Bachelor of Laws at K.P. Shah Law College, Jamnagar in 2014 and also received a Master's degree in Gandhian Thought and Social Science from Gujarat Vidyapith in 2016. He also created and edited the magazine Pamaraat in college.

Career 
Chavda started his career as a personal tutor at Saraswati Study Center in 1995. He then served as a co-editor of the magazines Kavilok (2003–04), Kumar (2004–06) and Uddesh (2007–08). He was a guest lecturer at the Department of Communication and Journalism, Gujarat University, the Sardar Patel Institution of Public Administration (SPIPA) and other educational institutions in Ahmedabad. In 2008, he joined Gujarat Ayurveda University as an information officer and later worked there as an assistant registrar. Currently, he is working at Gujarat Technological University of Ahmedabad as an assistant registrar.

Literary career 
Chavda began writing during his school days in 1993. In July 1997, he joined the poetry workshop Budh Sabha where he met other Gujarati poets including Nalin Pandya, Barin Mehta, Pravin Pandya and Labhshankar Thakar. In 1998, he published his first poem in the magazine Kavilok. Chavda would then publish poems in other Gujarati magazines such as Kavita, Kumar, Shabdasrishti, Gazalvishwa, Uddesh, Navneet Samarpan, Tadarthya, Dhabak, Parab and Dalitchetna. In 2007, his ghazals appeared in Vis Pancha, a compilation of ghazals by young Gujarati poets which included Anil Chavda, Bhavesh Bhatt, Hardwar Goswami and Chandresh Makvana.

Chavda has served on the Directional Committee of Gujarat Lekhak Mandal (Writer's Association of Gujarat), and is currently on the advisory board of Gujarati Language at Sahitya Akademi in New Delhi and the executive committee of Gujarat Dalit Sahitya Pratishthan.

In March 2013, he was invited by Sahitya Akademi to give a lecture on Why do I write.

Works 

Chavda published his first ghazal collection, Pagla Talaavm, in 2003, followed by Pagrav Talaavma in 2012, which was critically acclaimed by Chinu Modi, Rajesh Vyas 'Miskin' and Ramesh Parekh.

In 2012, he published Dalkhi Thi Saav Chhutan, which is a collection of postmodern Gujarati poetry. That same year, he also published Pityo Ashko, which is a collection of humorous poetry he wrote during his college days. A lyrical poem from Pityo Ashko, titled Millennium Radha nu Geet, was originally published in Kavita (September 1999) by Suresh Dalal.

Tu Kahu Ke Tame (2012) is a collection of lyrical poems by Chavda. He has also written motivational books, one-act plays on social issues and documentaries. Recently, he penned the lyrics for the Gujarati film Paghadi.

Shabdoday (2012), a collection of 25 critical essays and seven book reviews, was critically acclaimed by Dhiru Parikh, a Gujarati writer and former president of the Gujarati Sahitya Parishad.

He compiled Concise Dictionary of Practical Verbs (2012). He translated This Ancient Lyre (2005), Malayalam poet O. N. V. Kurup's collection of poems edited by A. J. Thomas, into Gujarati as Aa Prachin Vadya (2020).

Awards and recognition 

Chavda received the Yuva Gaurav Award (2012) and the Dasi Jivan Award (2013–14), awarded by Gujarat Sahitya Akademi and the Government of Gujarat.

His book Dalkhi Thi Saav Chhutan was awarded the Yuva Puraskar (2013) by Sahitya Akademi.

In 2014, he received the Vishesh Sanman from the South Gujarat Professor's Association. His books Pityo Ashko and Pagrav Talaavma were awarded the Best Book Prize (2012) in the Humorous and Poetry section by Gujarat Sahitya Akademi.

In 2017, he was invited by the president of India to the Writers Residence Program at Rashtrapati Bhavan and also received the Ravji Patel Yuva Pratibha Award.

Personal life 
Chavda's family is native to Mandasar, a village near Than-Chotila in the Surendranagar district. On December 14, 2004, Chavda married his wife Madhu and they have a daughter and son; Maitree and Harshil.

See also 
 List of Gujarati-language writers

References

External links 
 

1978 births
Living people
Gujarati-language poets
Gujarati-language writers
Indian male poets
People from Ahmedabad district
People from Surendranagar district
Poets from Gujarat
Translators to Gujarati
Recipients of the Sahitya Akademi Yuva Puraskar